Clinton Avenue School is a bilingual (American English and Spanish) school located at 293 Clinton Avenue in the Fair Haven neighborhood of New Haven, Connecticut, USA.  It was built in 1911 and underwent extensive renovations beginning in 2004.  The original design was similar to the nearby Truman School, both Beaux Arts style buildings.

Renovations
The school taught kindergarten through fourth grade with an enrollment of 410 students until its temporary closure.  Its size was approximately 58,000 square feet (5,400 m²).  Renovations by Boroson Falconer Architects & Engineers, headed by Ken Boroson, was completed in 2005, enlarging the school by over 36,000 square feet (3,300 m²), with a new total area of 94,000 square feet (8,700 m²).  The enrollment increased to 650, supporting kindergarten through eighth grade.  The cost of renovations was $25,106,000 USD Rededication took place on October 23, 2005.

Along with the renovations was the installation of a commissioned sculpture by Douglas Kornfeld called the "Tree of Life", a 17' tall laser-cut bright red steel tree.

Demographics
In 2004 the enrollment was 67% Hispanic, 32% African American, and 1% white, with under 1% Asian.

Principals
 Francis J. Smith (1960, 1961)
 John Leary (?-1983)
 Richard Whitney (1983–1986)
 Patricia DeRenzo (1986–2004)
 Carmen Ana Rodriguez-Robles (2005–2016)
 Kristina DeNegre (2016–2020)

References

External links
 Clinton Avenue School - Official Site
 GreatSchools.Net
 New Haven School Construction - Clinton Avenue School

Public elementary schools in Connecticut
Fair Haven (New Haven)
Schools in New Haven, Connecticut